John Gilliland Crawford (born July 5, 1946) is an American politician from Georgia.

Early life and education
Crawford was born in Chattooga County, Georgia. After graduating from the University of Georgia in 1968, he spent two years in the United States Marine Corps. By profession, he is a farmer.

Political career
On February 11, 1975—at the age of 28—Crawford won a special election to the Georgia House of Representatives. He was elected to replace James H. Floyd, who had died in office. Crawford served until 1977, then returned to the chamber following a victory in 1978. He remained a member of the House until his resignation in 1990. During his final term, Crawford served as vice-chairman of the Natural Resources & Environment Committee.

Personal life
Crawford resides in Lyerly, Georgia. He has two children and is a Presbyterian.

References

1946 births
Living people
Democratic Party members of the Georgia House of Representatives